The Declaration of the Rights of the Peoples of Russia was a document promulgated by the Bolshevik government of Russia on November 15 (November 2 by Old Style), 1917 (signed by Vladimir Lenin and Joseph Stalin).

The document proclaimed:

 Equality and sovereignty of peoples of Russia
 Right of peoples of Russia of a free self-determination, including secession and formation of a separate state
 Abolition of all national and religious privileges and restrictions
 Free development of national minorities and ethnographical groups populating the territory of Russia.

The meaning of the Declaration is still disputed in Russian historiography. In 1917 the Bolshevist thinking was still largely idealistic, dominated by vague ideas of "universal happiness". Also, at that moment Bolsheviks believed that the World revolution was imminent, so they did not care much about loss of territories. 

However, in the cold-war western literature, it is often argued that in fact Lenin and Stalin agreed to liberate mostly the territories they had no sovereignty over since Russia had lost them to Central Powers in 1915 and 1916. Many historians suggest that the purpose of the document was to limit the public dissent after Russia lost most of its western areas to the advancing German Empire and try to complicate the matters behind the front lines.

But in reality, the declaration had the effect of rallying some ethnic non-Russians behind the Bolsheviks. Latvian riflemen were important supporters of Bolsheviks in the early days of Russian Civil War and Latvian historians recognize the promise of sovereignty as an important reason for that. The anti-revolutionary White Russians did not support self-determination and, as a result, few Latvians fought on the side of the White movement.

Intended or not, the declaration's provided right to secede was soon exercised by peripheral regions in western Russia, part or which had already been under German army's rather than Moscow's control. But as the revolution spread, also many areas within Russia that have long been integrated declared themselves independent republics. Bolshevist Russia would, however, attempt to establish Soviet power in as many of those as possible. All three Baltic states experienced wars between Soviet governments aiming to establish a Communist state allied with Bolshevist Russia and non-Communist governments aiming for an independent state. The Soviet governments received direct military support from Russia. After the non-Communist side won, Russia recognized them as the legitimate governments of the Baltic states in 1920. The countries would be later invaded and annexed by the Soviet Union in 1939.

Russian historiography often cited the document as one of the main bases for the liberation of Central European states. Poland, Ukraine, Lithuania, Latvia, Belarus and Estonia were either created as puppet states by the Central Powers or liberated by the nations of the abovementioned countries themselves after the collapse of Germany and Austria-Hungary.

List of seceded lands 
The following countries declared their independence soon after the Bolsheviks' declaration, establishing themselves as non-Communist states. Although the role this declaration played in their declared independence is doubtful, it eased Bolshevist Russia's recognition of their independence. Except for Finland, all of these areas were outside of Russian sovereignty following the Austro-German successes in the Great War and were officially ceded in the Treaty of Brest-Litovsk, but the Bolsheviks could not have known this development at the time of the Declaration.

  Finland (December 6, 1917)
  (December 11, 1917)
  Ukraine (autonomy November 22, 1917, independence January 22, 1918)
  Moldova (autonomy December 15, 1917, independence February 6, 1918,     joined Romania on April 9, 1918)
  (April 22, 1918)
  Belarus (March 25, 1918)
  Poland (November 11, 1918)
  (November 18, 1918)

(exact dates need correction)

These countries declared their independence, as Communist states, soon after the declaration:

  (June 1918)

Several other independent republics were proclaimed but were short-lived:

  Transcaucasia (February 24, 1918)
  Kuban
  Kazan
 
 
  Bashkurdistan
 
  North Ingria

Later developments
Bolsheviks never formally rejected the idea of self-determination, but the Soviet Constitutions (of 1924, 1936 and 1977) limited the right of secession to the constituent republics only.

See also
Universal Declaration on the Rights of Peoples

Russian Revolution
Minority rights
Official documents of the Russian Soviet Federative Socialist Republic
1917 documents
1917 in Russia
November 1917 events